The Senate Finance Subcommittee on Health Care is one of the six subcommittees within the Senate Committee on Finance.

Members, 118th United States Congress

External links
Committee on Finance, Subcommittee page from the U.S. Senate website

References

Finance Health Care